Yakiv is a given name. Notable people with the name include:

Yakiv Barabash (died 1658), Zaporozhian Cossack Otaman (1657–58) who opposed Hetman Ivan Vyhovsky
Yakiv Hodorozha (born 1993), Ukrainian former competitive figure skater
Yakiv Holovatsky (1814–1888), Galician historian, literary scholar, ethnographer, linguist, poet, leader of Galician Russophiles
Yakiv Hordiyenko (1925–1942), Soviet partisan from Ukraine
Yakiv Khammo (born 1994), Assyrian-Ukrainian judoka
Yakiv Kripak (born 1978), former Ukrainian football midfielder
Yakiv Kulik (1793–1863), Austrian mathematician known for his construction of a massive factor tables
Yakiv Lyzohub, military and political figure of the Cossack Hetmanate
Yakiv Medvetskyi (1880–1941), Greek Catholic hierarch
Yakiv Punkin (1921–1994), featherweight Greco-Roman wrestler from Ukraine
Yakiv Smolii (born 1961), Ukrainian economist and banker, former Chairman of the National Bank of Ukraine
Yakiv Somko (died 1664), Ukrainian Cossack military leader of the Pereyaslav regiment
Yakiv Stepovy (1883–1921), Ukrainian composer, music teacher, and music critic
Yakiv Tymchuk, O.S.B.M. (1919–1988), Ukrainian Greek Catholic clandestine hierarch
Yakiv Yatsynevych (1869–1945), Ukrainian composer, conductor, and folklorist, known for his eclectic works
Yakiv Zalevskyi (born 1980), Ukrainian professional football coach and former player
Yakiv Zheleznyak (born 1941), former Soviet sport shooter and Olympic champion